The Rollergirls of Southern Indiana was a women's flat-track roller derby league in Evansville, Indiana started by Kristen Wood and Jesse Wilkins, and was a member in the North Central Region of the Women's Flat Track Derby Association.

The Rollergirls of Southern Indiana had over 30 active skaters and consisted of one interleague travel team that competed with other leagues from around the Midwest and beyond: the Rollergirls of Southern Indiana. The league also had a strong reserve team at one time.

The Rollergirls of Southern Indiana venue was at Swonder Ice Arena in Evansville, Indiana.

The league dissolved on September 22, 2012.

References

External links
 Official Rollergirls of Southern Indiana Website
 WFTDA web site

Former Women's Flat Track Derby Association leagues
Roller derby leagues established in 2007
Sports clubs disestablished in 2012
2007 establishments in Indiana
2012 disestablishments in Indiana